William Henry Harrison High School is a name for at least three high schools in the United States. William Henry Harrison High Schools include:

 William Henry Harrison High School (Evansville, Indiana), Evansville, Indiana
 William Henry Harrison High School (West Lafayette, Indiana), West Lafayette, Indiana
 William Henry Harrison High School (Ohio), Harrison, Ohio